William Olson (October 11, 1873 – November 1, 1931) was an American farmer and politician.

Born in the town of Jordan, Wisconsin, he went to Northern Indiana Normal School (now Valparaiso University) and taught school and worked on his family farm. He served in town government and was a member of the Green County, Wisconsin Board of Supervisors. Olson was a bank director and dairy farmer. He served in the Wisconsin State Assembly in 1919, 1921, and 1925 as a Republican and then served in the Wisconsin State Senate, where he died in office following an illness of several months.

Notes

1873 births
1931 deaths
People from Jordan, Wisconsin
Valparaiso University alumni
Businesspeople from Wisconsin
County supervisors in Wisconsin
Republican Party members of the Wisconsin State Assembly
Republican Party Wisconsin state senators